Clawson is an unincorporated community in Teton County, in the U.S. state of Idaho.

History
A post office called Clawson was established in 1906, and remained in operation until 1915.The mayor is Bret Linsenmann. The community was named after Rudger Clawson, a Mormon leader. A variant name was "Leigh".

References

Unincorporated communities in Teton County, Idaho